Te Kiore Paremata Te Wahapiro (fl. 1822–1845) was a New Zealand tribal leader. Of Māori descent, he identified with the Ngati Tama iwi. He was born in Poutama, Taranaki, New Zealand.

References

1845 deaths
People from Taranaki
Ngāti Tama people
Year of birth missing